Victorgorgia is a genus of cnidarians belonging to the monotypic family Victorgorgiidae.

The species of this genus are found in Pacific Ocean, Central America.

Species:

Victorgorgia alba 
Victorgorgia argentea 
Victorgorgia eminens 
Victorgorgia fasciculata 
Victorgorgia flabellata 
Victorgorgia iocasica 
Victorgorgia josephinae 
Victorgorgia macrocalyx 
Victorgorgia nyahae

References

Victorgorgiidae
Octocorallia genera